Templestowe Province was an electorate of the Victorian Legislative Council. It existed as a two-member electorate from 1967 to 2006, with members serving alternating eight-year terms. It was traditionally held by the Liberal Party, but was held by the Labor Party on two occasions: from 1982 to 1988 and again from 2002 to 2006. It was abolished from the 2006 state election in the wake of the Bracks Labor government's reform of the Legislative Council.

It was located in the north-east of Melbourne. In 2002, when it was last contested, it covered an area of 123 km2 and included the suburbs of Bulleen, Doncaster, Eltham, Heidelberg, Ivanhoe, Montmorency, Rosanna and Templestowe.

Members for Templestowe Province

Election results

References
Psephos Election Results for Victoria — Adam Carr's Election Archive
Province of Templestowe — Parliamentary Handbook for the 55th Parliament of Victoria
Newspaper articles:
"Preselection – Another Lib MP Dumped", Sunday Age, 1991-06-02
"Judges Seek Justice", The Age, 1994-03-10
Obituary for Sir Raymond Garrett, The Age, 1994-10-25
"Libs Dump Veteran MP", Paul Robinson, Sunday Age, 1995-12-03
"Man Of Vision Gets Honorable Send-off", Meaghan Shaw, The Age, 2001-01-17
Victorian Electoral Commission (correspondence)

Former electoral provinces of Victoria (Australia)
1967 establishments in Australia
2006 disestablishments in Australia